Brookesia decaryi is a species of chameleon, which is endemic to Madagascar, and is ranked as an endangered species by the International Union for Conservation of Nature (IUCN). It was initially described in 1939 by Fernand Angel. B. decaryi is commonly known as Decary's leaf chameleon, spiny leaf chameleon, or Decary's pygmy chameleon.

Etymology
The specific name, decaryi, is in honor of French botanist Raymond Decary.

Geographic range
B. decaryi can only be found on the island of Madagascar in Ankarafantsika National Park (Parc National d'Ankarafantsika), northwest Madagascar.

Habitat
The species can be found over an area of  – the size of the Parc National d'Ankarafantsika – in dry forest.

Reproduction
B. decaryi is oviparous. However, details about its reproduction are unknown, although clutch sizes between two and five eggs have previously been found.

Behavior

Conservation status
B. decaryi is classed as endangered by the IUCN, and the population might be decreasing. It is protected under the laws of Malagasy (Madagascar), although it can be collected, if authorised. However, collection in the Parc National d'Ankarafantsika is not permitted. The spiny leaf chameleon is threatened by wood harvesting, fires, farming, and ranching.

References

Further reading
Glaw F, Vences M (2006). A Field Guide to the Amphibians and Reptiles of Madagascar, Third Edition. Cologne, Germany: Vences & Glaw Verlag. 496 pp. .

D
Endemic fauna of Madagascar
Reptiles of Madagascar
Endangered fauna of Africa
Reptiles described in 1939
Taxa named by Fernand Angel